The 64th Regiment Illinois Volunteer Infantry, nicknamed "Yates' Sharpshooters" was an infantry regiment that served in the Union Army during the American Civil War.

Service
The 64th Illinois Infantry was organized at Camp Butler, Illinois and mustered into Federal service in December 1861 as a battalion of four companies under Lt Colonel D.E. Williams.  Two additional companies were raised on December 31, 1861, under Major Fred W. Matteson. Moved to Quincy, Ill., January 10, 1862, thence to Cairo, Ill., February 15, and to New Madrid, Mo., March 4, 1862. Attached to the Army of the Mississippi, unassigned, to April 1862. 2nd Brigade, 1st Division, Army Mississippi, to May 1862. Unattached, Army of the Mississippi, to November 1862. Unattached, District of Corinth, 13th Army Corps (Old), Dept. of the Tennessee, to December 1862. Unattached, District of Corinth, 17th Army Corps, to January 1863. Unattached, District of Corinth, 16th Army Corps, to March 1863. Unattached, 2nd Division, 16th Army Corps, to November 1863. Fuller's Brigade, 2nd Division, 16th Army Corps, to March 1864. 1st Brigade, 4th Division, 16th Army Corps, to September 1864. 1st Brigade, 1st Division, 17th Army Corps, to July 1866.

The regiment was discharged from service on July 18, 1865.

Detailed Service
Operations against New Madrid, Mo., and Island No. 10, Mississippi River, March 4 - April 8, 1862. Action at New Madrid March 12. Capture of New Madrid March 14. Capture of Island No. 10 April 8. Expedition to Fort Pillow, Tenn., April 13–17. Moved to Hamburg Landing, Tenn., April 17–22. Advance on and siege of Corinth, Miss., April 29 - May 30. Action at Farmington, Miss., May 3. Reconnaissance toward Corinth May 8. Action at Farmington May 9. Pursuit to Booneville May 31 - June 12. Tuscumbia Creek May 31 - June 1. Reconnaissance toward Baldwyn June 3. At Big Springs and on guard duty at Headquarters of General Rosecrans, Commanding Army Mississippi, until November 27. Reconnaissance to Iuka and skirmish September 16. Battle of Iuka September 19. Battle of Corinth, Miss., October 3–4. Pursuit to the Hatchie River October 5–12. On Outpost duty at Glendale, Miss., November 27, 1862, to November 4, 1863. Moved to Iuka, thence to Pulaski, Tenn., November 4–11, and duty there until January 1864, and at Decatur, Ala., until May. Veterans on furlough January 15 to March 17, 1864. Four new Companies, "G," "H," "I" and "K," organized February and March 1864 by Captain (subsequently Lt Colonel) M.W. Manning. Moved to Decatur, Ala., March 17–23. Atlanta (Ga.) Campaign May 1 - September 8. Demonstrations on Resaca May 8–13. Near Resaca May 13. Battle of Resaca May 14–15. Advance on Dallas May 18–25. Operations on line of Pumpkin Vine Creek and battles about Dallas, New Hope Church and Allatoona Hills May 25 - June 5. Near New Hope Church June 5. Operations about Marietta and against Kenesaw Mountain June 10 - July 2. Assault on Kenesaw June 27. Nickajack Creek July 2–5. Ruff's Mills July 3–4. Chattahoochie River July 6–17. Nance's Creek July 17. Decatur July 19–22. Battle of Atlanta July 22. Siege of Atlanta July 22 - August 25. Flank movement on Jonesboro August 25–30. Battle of Jonesboro August 31 - September 1. Lovejoy Station September 2–6. Reconnaissance to Fairburn October 1–3. Pursuit of Hood into Alabama October 4–29. Snake Creek Gap October 15–16. March to the sea November 15 - December 10. Montieth Swamp December 9. Siege of Savannah December 10–21. Campaign of the Carolinas January to April 1865. Reconnaissance to Salkehatchie River, S.C., January 20. Salkehatchie Swamps February 1–5. Rivers' and Broxton's Bridges, Salkehatchie River, February 2. Rivers' Bridge February 3. South Edisto River February 9. North Edisto River February 11–12. Columbia February 15–17. Juniper Creek near Cheraw, March 2. Cheraw March 3–4. Battle of Bentonville, N. C, March 20–21. Occupation of Goldsboro March 24. Advance on Raleigh April 10–14. Occupation of Raleigh April 14. Bennett's House April 26. Surrender of Johnston and his army. March to Washington, D.C., via Richmond, Va., April 29 - May 19. Grand Review May 24. Moved to Louisville, Ky., June 6.

Mustered out July. 11 and discharged at Chicago, Ill., July 18, 1865.

Total strength and casualties
The regiment suffered 6 officers and 106 enlisted men who were killed in action or mortally wounded and 2 officers and 131 enlisted men who died of disease, for a total of 242 fatalities.

Commanders
Lieutenant Colonel D. E. Williams - Commanded from mustering of the regiment until his departure on sick leave on May 17, 1862. Lt Col Williams never returned to the unit, and was discharged on September 11, 1862.
Major Fred W. Matteson - Took command of the Battalion from Lt Colonel Williams' departure, until he also took ill and died in hospital on April 8, 1862.
Colonel John Morrill - Originally commanding officer of Co "A". Captain Morrill took command after Major Matteson's death. Captain Morrill was subsequently promoted to Lt Colonel in command of the battalion. After the 64th Illinois was expanded to regimental size, he was promoted to Colonel. He commanded the regiment until he was wounded during the July 22, 1864 Battle of Atlanta. Meritoriously breveted Brigadier General
Lt. Colonel M. W. Manning - From July 22, 1864, to November 12, 1864.
Captain Joseph Smith Reynolds - From November 12, 1864, to muster-out. After taking command, Captain Reynolds was promoted to Lt. Colonel and subsequently breveted Brigadier General.

See also
List of Illinois Civil War Units
Illinois in the American Civil War

Notes

References
 Dyer, Frederick H. A Compendium of the War of the Rebellion (Des Moines, IA:  Dyer Pub. Co.), 1908.
 
 Report of the Adjutant General of the State of Illinois 1900-1902
The Civil War Archive
The Rifles of the 64th Illinois Volunteer Infantry by John Thurston
Reenactment unit

External link

Units and formations of the Union Army from Illinois
1861 establishments in Illinois
Military units and formations established in 1861
Military units and formations disestablished in 1865